The men's standing high jump was a track and field athletics event held as part of the athletics at the 1912 Summer Olympics programme. It was the fourth and final appearance of the event. The competition was held on Saturday, July 13, 1912.

Ray Ewry, who was the three-time defending champion in the event, did not compete in 1912. The silver medalist from 1908, Konstantinos Tsiklitiras, took bronze. Platt Adams, the fifth-place finisher four years earlier, won the event. Benjamin Adams finished second. It was the second time in Olympic history that brothers had finished first and second in an event, after the Paine brothers in the 1896 military pistol shooting event. Each of the three standing high jump medalists also medaled in the standing long jump, though in a different order.

Seventeen high jumpers from nine nations competed. NOCs could enter up to 12 athletes.

Background

This was the fourth and final appearance of the event, which was held four times from 1900 to 1912. Three-time defending champion (four-time if the 1906 Intercalated Games are counted) Ray Ewry of the United States had retired, leaving the competition relatively open. Returning competitors from the 1908 Games were silver medalist Konstantinos Tsiklitiras of Greece and fifth-place finishers Platt Adams of the United States and Géo André of France.

Chile and Russia each made their debut in the event. The United States made its fourth appearance, the only nation to have competed in each appearance of the event.

Competition format

For the first time, there were two distinct rounds of jumping with results cleared between rounds (the 1908 Games had featured a two-round event but the results from the qualifying round then carried over to the final). All jumpers clearing 1.50 metres in the qualifying round advanced to the final.

Records

These were the standing world and Olympic records (in metres) prior to the 1908 Summer Olympics.

No new world or Olympic records were set during the competition.

Schedule

Results

Qualifying

Final

References

 sports-reference.com
 
 

Athletics at the 1912 Summer Olympics
1912